Carl Gnodtke (January 2, 1936 – May 29, 2000) was a Republican member of the Michigan House of Representatives, representing most of Berrien County for 17 years.

A native of Weesaw Township, Gnodtke served in several local offices, including on the township board (1965-1969), as a county commissioner (1969-1975), and as drain commissioner (1976-1978). He was elected to the House in 1978.

In the House, Gnodtke was known as an authority on agriculture issues, and ultimately chaired the agriculture committee.

Gnodtke retired from the House in 1996 to spend more time with his grandchildren and restore four vintage tractors. He suffered a heart attack at the University of Michigan Hospital in Ann Arbor and died there on May 29, 2000, aged 64.

References

1936 births
2000 deaths
Republican Party members of the Michigan House of Representatives
Farmers from Michigan
People from Berrien County, Michigan
20th-century American politicians